Great Bridge Unity F.C. was an English association football club from Great Bridge, then in Staffordshire, now in the West Midlands county.

History
The Unity first entered competitive football in 1883-84, with an entry for the Birmingham Senior Cup and the Walsall Cup.  In the former, the club lost to Sutton Coldfield in the first round, after two replays.  In the latter, the club beat Aston Victoria in the first round, but lost to West Bromwich All Saints in the second.

The club competed in the FA Cup in the 1887-88 season.  In the first round, the Unity was beaten by Stafford Road F.C., but the Football Association ordered a replay as only seven of the Stafford Road players were eligible for the tournament.  Rather than replay the tie, the Wolverhampton side scratched, and played a friendly against the Unity on the due date (which ended 1-1).

In the second round, the Unity came from 2-1 down to beat Burton Swifts 5-2 away from home.  The Unity beat Birmingham Excelsior away in the third  but were finally downed by Bootle in the fourth, amid controversy; the Sporting Life judged Bootle's winner to have been offside, and the Unity made protests against the eligibility of six Bootle players.  By the time the appeal had been heard, Bootle had been knocked out by the Old Carthusians, and the FA had little appetite for finding in the Unity's favour in such circumstances.

In 1889-90 the club was one of the founders of the Birmingham and District League; it later dropped out but resumed membership of the league for the season of 1891–92, but did not complete the season.

The final reported matches for the club are in the 1895-96 season, in the West Midland League for amateur and reserve clubs.

Colours

The club wore white shirts, although it formally described its colours as black and white.

Records
FA Cup
Best performance: 4th Round – 1887-88

Dudley Charity Cup 
Winners: 1885-86

Notable players
Jack Glover, League champion with Liverpool

Later clubs

There were various attempts to start a new Great Bridge Unity club, the only one with any longevity being a 1910s incarnation which played in the very low-ranking Hill Top League in Birmingham.

References

Defunct football clubs in England
Defunct football clubs in the West Midlands (county)
Association football clubs established in the 19th century